Craig Cormick  is an Australian science communicator and author. He was born in Wollongong in 1961, and is known for his creative writing and social research into public attitudes towards new technologies. He has lived mainly in Canberra, but has also lived in Iceland (1980–81) and Finland (1984–85). He has published over 40 books of fiction and non-fiction, and numerous articles in refereed journals. He has been active in the Canberra writing community, teaching and editing, was Chair of the ACT Writers Centre from 2003 to 2008 and in 2006 was Writer in Residence at the University of Science in Penang, Malaysia.

Cormick's creative writing has appeared in most of Australia's literary journals including Southerly, Westerly, Island, Meanjin, The Phoenix Review, Overland, Scarp, 4W, Redoubt, Block, as well as in overseas publications including Silverfish New Writing (Malaysia) and Foreign Literature No 6 (China). He has previously been an editor of the radical arts magazine Blast, and his writing awards include the ACT Book of the Year Award in 1999 a Queensland Premier's Literary Award in 2006, a Victorian Community History Award in 2015,  the ACT Writing and Publishing Award in 2015 and the Tasmanian Writers' Prize in 2016.

As a science communicator he has worked for the CSIRO, Questacon and the Department of Industry, Innovation and Science, and has represented the Australian Government at many international science forums including Apec and OECD conferences, presenting on issues relating to public concerns about new technologies. In 2013 he was awarded the Unsung Hero of Science Communications by the Australian Science Communicators.  Since 2019 he has been serving on the Advisory Board on Education and Outreach to the Nobel Prize Winning Organisation for the Prohibition of Chemical Weapons.

Cormick was awarded the Medal of the Order of Australia (OAM) in the 2021 Queen's Birthday Honours "service to science, and to the community".

Literary career 

Craig Cormick went on to study journalism and creative writing at the University of Canberra – both areas which he continues to work in – with stints at the Canberra School of Art, the University of Iceland and Helsinki University. He returned to the University of Canberra to study languages, public relations and sociology, undertake a Masters in Communications and then completed a PhD in Creative Communications at Deakin University in 2007.

His first books were self-published or picked up by small presses until Unwritten Histories was published by Aboriginal Studies Press in 1998. The book subsequently won the ACT Book of the Year Award and received praising reviews. His work has a strong sense of satire, across themes that include exploration, isolation, duality and Ned Kelly (who appears at least once in each of his eight short story collections). He has written and published, on average, one book a year since 1998, including collections of short fiction, novels and non-fiction.

He has published scholarly articles on public attitudes to new technologies in publications including: NanoEthics, the International Journal of Biotechnology Agricultural Science, Historia Ciencias Saude (Brazil) and Choices (USA). He also authored the Australian Government reports, Cloning Goes to the Movies, and What you really need to know about what the public really thinks about GM foods.

In 2008 he fulfilled "a life's dream" and travelled to Antarctica as an Antarctic Arts Fellow, visiting the three Australian stations on the continent, Casey, Davis and Mawson, publishing his experiences as In Bed with Douglas Mawson: Travels around Antarctica, in 2011, which merges his two interests of science and creative writing.

In 2014 and 2015 he published the acclaimed the Shadow Master series with Angry Robot books, in the US and UK, as was a guest author at the Convergence fan convention in Minneapolis, and at WorldCon in Helsinki in 2018. In 2015 he also took part in the Yale Writers Conference.

Writing awards 

 2022 Winner of the Special Book Award from 2020 as a part of the ACT Notable Awards 2022 for On A Barbarous Coast.
 2022 – Shortlisted for an Aurealis Award for Science Fiction Novella, The Cruise to the End of the World
 2020 – Winner of the Roly Susses Short Story Prize for the Lost Journal of Edmund Kennedy.
  2019 Winner of the ACT Writing and Publishing Awards - non-fiction, for  Backseat Drivers, 2018.
  2019 - Shortlisted for the ACT Writing and Publishing Awards - fiction for Years of the Wolf, 2018.
  2019 Shortlisted for a Victorian Community History Award, for  Backseat Drivers, 2018.
  2019 - Shortlisted for an Aurealis Award for Best Horror Book for Years of the Wolf, 2018.
  2016 - Winner of the Tasmanian Writers' Prize 2016.
  2015 – Winner of a Victorian Community History Award, for Ned Kelly under the Microscope, 2015.
  2015 – Winner of the ACT Writing and Publishing Award for Uncle Adolf, 2015. 
  2010 – Shortlisted for the ACT Writing and Publishing Awards for Futures Trading, 2010.
 2006 – Winner of Queensland Premier’s Award for A Funny Thing Happened at 27,000 Feet (Steele Rudd Award for a collection of short fiction).
 2004 – Short-listed for a Queensland Premier's Award for the Princess of Cups (Steele Rudd Award for a collection of short fiction).
 2000 – Second Prize in the Age Short Story Contest.
 2000 – Second Prize in the University of Canberra Short Story contest.
 2000 – Nominated for ACT Artist of the Year.
 1999 – ACT Book of the Year Award for Unwritten Histories, 1998.
 1999 – Highly commended in the Victorian Fellowship of Australian Writers Jim Hamilton Award.
 1998 – First Prize in the Max Harris Literary Awards.
 1998 – First Prize in the Arts West Writing Competition.
 1998 – Second Prize in the Not the Premier's Literary Award.
 1998 – Second Prize in the R Carson Gold Short Story Competition.
 1998 – Shortlisted for the ANU/Anutech short story award.
 1997 – Canberra Critics Circle award for literature.
 1995 – Shortlisted for the ANU/Anutech short story award.
 1996 – Highly commended in the National Book Council Award.
 1993 – Shortlisted for the Australian-Vogel Award for Of One Blood.

Works

Books published 
 Archangel, Merino Press, .
 The Twilight of the Time Vandals, Merino Press, .
 What If History of Australia: Gold Rush: Going Gold Crazy, Big Sky Publishing, .
 What If History of Australia: Colonial Settlement: France vs Britain, Big Sky Publishing, .
 The Cruise to the End of the World, Merino Press, .
 On A Barbarous Coast(with Harold Ludwick), Allen and Unwin, 2020. . 
 The Science of Communicating Science, CSIRO Publishing, 2019. . 
 Years of the Wolf, IFWG Australia, 2018. . (Shortlisted for an Aurealis Award for Best Horror Book).
 Backseat Drivers, Ginninderra Press, 2018. . (Shortlisted for a Victorian Community History Award).
 The Seven Voyages of Captain Cook, Dimension 6, coeur de lion, 2017. . (Shortlisted for a 2017 Aurealis Award - Best Anthology).
 Valdur the Viking and the Ghostly Goths, Ford Street Publishing, 2016. .
 The Floating City, Angry Robot Books, 2015. . 
 Ned Kelly Under the Microscope, CSIRO Publishing, 2014. (Winner of a Victorian Community History Award, 2015) . 
 The Shadow Master, Angry Robot Books, 2014. . 
 Uncle Adolf, Ginninderra Press, 2014. (Winner of an ACT Publishing Award, 2015). . 
 Benji the Buccaneer (Children's book), New Frontier, 2014. . 
 Time Vandals, Scholastic Australia, 2012. .
 Shipwrecks of the Southern Seas, Murdoch Books, 2011. .
 In Bed with Douglas Mawson, New Holland Press, 2011. .
 Futures Trading, Mockingbird Press, 2009.[*Shortlisted for the ACT Writing and Publishing Awards 2010]. .
 The Last Super: The creation and recreation of Alexander Pearce, the 'cannibal convict' of Van Diemen's Land, Lambert Academic Publishing, 2009. .
 Of One Blood, Australian Booksellers Association, 2007. [*As a manuscript, shortlisted for the Australian-Vogel Award in 1993, the National Book Council Award in 1996 and the Victorian Fellowship of Australian Writers Jim Hamilton Award in 1999]. .
 The Prince of Frogs, Mockingbird Press, 2007. /
 A Funny Thing Happened at 27,000 feet..., Mockingbird Press, 2005.[*Winner of the Queensland Premier's Award – Steel Rudd Award for short fiction, 2006]. .
 The Princess of Cups, Mockingbird Press, 2003.[*Short-listed for the Queensland Premier's Award Steel Rudd Award, 2004]. .
 DIG: the Unwritten History of Burke and Wills, Ginninderra Press, 2002. .
 The Queen of Aegea, Mockingbird Press, 2001. .
 When Angels Call, [Short fiction by Craig Cormick, Poetry by Hal Judge and illustrations by Steve Harrison), Aberrant Genotype Press, 2001. .
 Kurikka's Dreaming, Simon and Schuster, 2000. [*featured on ABC Radio National's Australia Talks Books, May 2001]. .
 The King of Patagonia, Mockingbird Press, 1999. .
 Unwritten Histories  Aboriginal Studies Press, 1998. [*Winner of the 1999 ACT Chief Minister's Book of the Year Award]. .
 Pimplemania, MacMillan Educational, 1997. .

Books edited 

 Snapshots, Oak Publications, Malaysia, 2006. .
 Co-editor of Meeting of Muses, Mockingbird Press, 2003. .
 Co-editor of The Circulatory System, Mockingbird Press, 2001. .
 Co-editor of Time Pieces, Mockingbird Press, 1999. [*Commended in the Victorian FAW Community Writer's Award, 1999]. .
 Protesting the Testing: Canberra Writers Speak Out Against Nuclear Testing in the Pacific, 1995, (Left Book Club (ACT) and PEN (ACT)). .

Academic publications 

Cormick. C., Nielssen. O., Ashworth. P., La Salle. J., & Saab. C., What Do Science Communicators Talk About When They Talk About Science Communications? Engaging With the Engagers, Science Communication 37(2):274-282. 
Cormick. C., and Romanach, L., Segmentation studies provide insights to better understanding attitudes towards science and technology, Trends in Biotechnology, Volume 32, Issue 3, March 2014, Pages 114–116.
 Cormick.C., and Hunter. S., Valuing Values: Better Public Engagement on Nanotechnology Demands a Better Understanding of the Diversity of the Publics, NanoEthics, April 2014, Volume 8, Issue 1, pp 57–71.
 Ten Big Questions on Public Engagement on Science and Technology: Observation from a Rocky Boat in the Upstream and Downstream of Engagement, in DEMESCI – the International Journal of Deliberative Mechanisms in Science, Volume 1, number 1, August 2012.
 The Complexity of Public Engagement, in Nature Nanotechnology, February 2012.
 Why Do We Need to Know What the Public Thinks about Nanotechnology? NanoEthics, August 2009.
 Piecing Together the Elephant: Public Engagement on Nanotechnology Challenges’, Science and Engineering Ethics, Volume 15 Number 3, 2009.
 What do the Public Really Think and Who do they Really Trust, in  Human Biotechnology and Public Trust, Centre for Law and Genetics, University of Tasmania, 2008.
 Public Attitudes Towards GM Crops and Foods, Agricultural Science, Volume 21, No 2 – September 2007.
 A clonagem vai ao cinema, Historia Ciencias Saude,  Manghinhos, Brazil, Volume 13, October 2006.
 Lies Deep Fries and Statistics,Choices, USA. 2005.
 Perceptions of Risk Relating to Biotechnology in Australia, International Journal of Biotechnology. Vol 5, No 2, 2003.
 Recent Changes in Public Attitudes Towards Biotechnology in Australia, Australian Biologist, Vol.15 (2), September 2002.
 Australian Attitudes to GM Foods and Crops, Pesticide Outlook, Royal Society of Chemistry, December 2002.

References

External links 
 New Holland Publishers: Craig Cormick biography/photo
 Verity LA: An interview with Craig Cormick
 ABC: Craig Cormick interview with Margaret Throsby

Australian science writers
Living people
People from Canberra
1961 births
Recipients of the Medal of the Order of Australia